Cathy Battistessa is a British dance and balearic singer and songwriter, best known for her work with Blank & Jones, Cafe Del Mar and DJ Luck & MC Neat, with whom she had a top 10 hit in the UK.

Biography
Battistessa began working as a songwriter in 1993 in London, co-writing and performing as vocalist on dance tracks including Alpha Omega's "Rhythm Take Control" and one of the biggest selling songs on the Cafe del Mar series to date, a collaboration with the German production trio Levitation on "More Than Ever People". She also collaborated with the Prodigy's Leeroy Thornhill on "Dreamer" and featured on the Oracles remix of DJ Luck & MC Neat's "A Little Bit of Luck" which reached No. 9 on the UK Singles Chart. Throughout the 1990s and 2000s, she co-wrote numerous songs licensed to the Cafe del Mar including "Oh Home" with Paco Fernandez, "We the Light", "Tipped Up World" and "Two Eyes" with James Bright, a solo track titled "Heart of the Living Sun", two tracks with Blank & Jones; "Miracle Man" and "Happiness", Slowpulse's "Riva" and Afterlife's "Shine" and "Speck of Gold", which was written by Battistessa in a quest to write a song for hope in commemoration of the September 11 attacks, and was featured on several Cafe del Mar compilations. All these releases have been featured on seminal chillout and lounge compilations worldwide. 

In 2009, Battistessa received an invitation to sing for the Dalai Lama for his birthday celebration at the COBO Arena, Frankfurt, Germany.

Battistessa's influences include Ella Fitzgerald, Minnie Riperton, Nick Drake, Van Morrison and folk musician John Martyn.

Battistessa lives in Ibiza and has a son.

Discography

Solo
 "Calling" (2012)
 "Une Nouvelle Humanite" (2012)
 "Heart of the Living Sun" (2015)
 "Two Eye's" (2016)
 "King" (2018)
 "Good Times & Misfits" (2019)

Guest appearances
 Levitation, "More Than Ever People" (1998)
 Alpha Omega, "We're Gonna Make It" (1999)
 Alpha Omega, "Rhythm Take Control" (1999)
 DJ Luck & MC Neat, "A Little Bit Of Luck" (1999)
 Paco Fernandez and Levitation, "Oh Home" (1999)
 Slowpulse, "Riva" (2000)
 Slowpulse, "Elysian Tide" (2003)
 Stephane Pompougnac, "One Soul Rising" (2003)
 The Rainmaker, "Hands They Offer Wings" (2003)
 Rob da Bank / Lazyboy, "Don't Fret George" (2004)
 Chris Coco, "Memory of a Free Party" (2005)
 Chris Coco, "Starlight" (2006)
 Leg Soup, "Wonderland" (2006)
 Out Cold, "Presence" (2007)
 Out Cold, "Time'll Tell" (2008)
 Afterlife, Go Easy (2008)
 Afterlife, Speck of Gold (2008)
 Afterlife, Shine (2008)
 Afterlife, Let It Go (2008)
 Afterlife, Electrosensitive (2009)
 Paco Fernandez, "What Are We Living" (2009)
 Paco Fernandez, "Light Like This" (2009)
 with James Bright, "We The Light" (2014)
 Knee Deep, "All About Love" (2009)
 Ralf Gum, "All About Love" (2009)
 Grant Nelson, "Black Water" (2010)
 Blank & Jones, "Miracle Man" (2010)
 Charles Webster, "I Am the Sun" (2011)
 Blank & Jones, "Happiness" (2012)
 with James Bright, "Tipped Up World" (2014)
 RuMan Chu Remix "Two Eye's" (2015)

References

External links
Official site

British electronic musicians
British women pop singers
Living people
Year of birth missing (living people)